Graham Boase (born 12 October 1941) is an Australian former triple jumper who competed in the 1964 Summer Olympics.

References

1941 births
Living people
Australian male triple jumpers
Olympic athletes of Australia
Athletes (track and field) at the 1964 Summer Olympics